Callum Scotson (born 10 August 1996) is an Australian professional racing cyclist, who currently rides for UCI WorldTeam . He rode in the men's team pursuit at the 2016 UCI Track Cycling World Championships winning a gold medal.

Scotson's older brother Miles Scotson is also a successful professional cyclist and they are both former students of Trinity College Gawler. In August 2020, Scotson was studying a Bachelor of Commerce/Arts at Deakin University. In October 2020, he was named in the startlist for the 2020 Vuelta a España.

Major results

2016
 1st  Team pursuit, UCI Track World Championships
 1st  Time trial, National Under-23 Road Championships
 2nd  Team pursuit, Olympic Games
 3rd Six Days of London (with Cameron Meyer)
 5th Duo Normand (with Miles Scotson)
2017
 1st  Time trial, National Under-23 Road Championships
 1st Six Days of London (with Cameron Meyer)
 5th Time trial, UCI Road World Under-23 Championships
 5th Overall Le Triptyque des Monts et Chateaux
2018
 1st  Time trial, National Under-23 Road Championships
 4th Time trial, Commonwealth Games
 5th Paris–Roubaix Espoirs
 10th Time trial, UCI Road World Under-23 Championships

Grand Tour general classification results timeline

References

External links
 

1996 births
Living people
Australian male cyclists
People from Gawler, South Australia
Cyclists from South Australia
Australian track cyclists
Cyclists at the 2016 Summer Olympics
Olympic cyclists of Australia
Medalists at the 2016 Summer Olympics
Olympic silver medalists for Australia
Olympic medalists in cycling
Cyclists at the 2018 Commonwealth Games
Commonwealth Games competitors for Australia
20th-century Australian people
21st-century Australian people